WCDL (1440 AM) is a radio station licensed to Carbondale, Pennsylvania.  The station operates with 5,000 watts daytime and 37 watts nighttime with a non-directional antenna.  The Federal Communications Commission considers WCDL a Class D AM broadcast station.  Bold Gold Media Group is the current owner of WCDL.

History
The station flipped formats from adult standards to a mix of Tropical and Spanish language adult contemporary format in August 2007  branded as "Caliente" (translation from Spanish into English as "Hot") to serve the region's growing Hispanic population. Former sister station WNAK, 730 kHz, located in Nanticoke, started simulcasting WCDL programming in October 2007.

In late 2008 WCDL returned to the adult standards format, simulcasting with WNAK 730 kHz under the slogan "The Greatest Music of All Time".

As of 2011, WCDL was simulcasting with WICK and WYCK with sports as "The Game".

On March 8, 2020 WCDL changed their format from sports to oldies, branded as "The Mothership", simulcasting WICK 1400 AM Scranton.

References

External links
WCDL official website

Daytime Coverage Map of WCDL According to Radio-Locator.com

CDL
Radio stations established in 1977
Oldies radio stations in the United States